Bunagana is a town in the Western Region of Uganda. It sits across the international border from the similarly named town of Bunagana, Democratic Republic of the Congo.

Location
The town is located in extreme southwestern Uganda, in Kisoro District, at the international border between Uganda and the Democratic Republic of the Congo (DRC).

The coordinates of the town are:1°17'40.0"S, 29°35'59.0"E (Latitude:-1.294444; Longitude:29.599722).

Overview
Bunagana is a major crossing point, for both human and commercial traffic. On the Congolese side, a road leads to Goma, a city of approximately 600,000 people and the capital of North Kivu Province in the DRC. On the Ugandan side, Kabale, with a population estimated at about 54,000, lies to the east of Bunagana and is connected to it by an all-weather bitumen-surfaced road.

Points of interest
The following additional points of interest lie within the town limits or close to the edges of the town: (a) the offices of Bunagana Town Council (b) Bunagana Central Market, the source of daily fresh produce (c) Bwindi National Park in Uganda is northeast of Bunagana, while Virunga National Park in the DRC is southwest of the town (d) the town of Bunagana, DRC is immediately west of Bunagana, Uganda, across the border with the DRC.

The  Bunagana–Rutshuru–Goma Road starts here and ends in Goma, DR Congo. The  Kabale–Kisoro–Bunagana Road ends here, having started in Kabale, Uganda.

On 12 March 2021, Ugandan authorities began the construction of a One Stop Border Post (OSBP), at Bunagana, with a budget of US$1.3 million.

See also
 List of cities and towns in Uganda

References

External links
Website of Kisoro District Administration

Populated places in Western Region, Uganda
Cities in the Great Rift Valley
Kisoro District
Kigezi sub-region
Democratic Republic of the Congo–Uganda border crossings